Banele Sikhondze (born 28 June 1993) is a Liswati footballer who plays as a midfielder for Mbombela United and the Eswatini national team.

Club career
Having previously played for Manzini Wanderers, Manzini Sundowns and Mbabane Swallows, Sikhondze joined South African Premier Division side Polokwane City in the summer of 2018, initially on a one-year deal. In January 2020, Sikhondze left Polokwane City to join Mbombela United.

International career
Sikhondze made his debut for Eswatini in a 1–0 win against Guinea on 5 June 2016.

References

External links
 
 

Living people
1993 births
Swazi footballers
Eswatini international footballers
Association football midfielders
Manzini Wanderers F.C. players
Denver Sundowns F.C. players
Mbabane Swallows players
Polokwane City F.C. players
Mbombela United F.C. players
South African Premier Division players
National First Division players
Swazi expatriate footballers
Expatriate soccer players in South Africa
Swazi expatriate sportspeople in South Africa